Rafał Grodzicki (born October 28, 1983 in Kraków) is a Polish football centre-back who plays for Jutrzenka Giebułtów.

External links
 
 

1983 births
Living people
Polish footballers
MKS Cracovia (football) players
Górnik Wieliczka players
GKS Bełchatów players
Ruch Chorzów players
Śląsk Wrocław players
Stal Mielec players
Motor Lublin players
Ekstraklasa players
I liga players
II liga players
III liga players
Footballers from Kraków
Association football defenders